I Want to Live with You may refer to:

 "I Want to Live with You", a song by Tina Arena from her 1997 album In Deep
 "I Want to Live with You", a song by Alex Lahey from her 2019 album The Best of Luck Club